Acianthera tristis is a species of orchid plant native to Brazil.

Synonyms of Acianthera tristis are.

Basionym

References 

tristis
Flora of Brazil